Dinesh Rai Munmun (born 3 March 1967) is an Indian politician and a MLA of the Madhya Pradesh Legislative Assembly in the Seoni. He is a member of the Bharatiya Janata Party.

He was appointed the district president of Seoni of the Bharatiya Janata Party.

Personal life
Dinesh Rai Munmun was born in Seoni, Madhya Pradesh. He graduated with a Master of Commerce, Bachelor of Laws degree from Rani Durgavati Vishwavidyalaya. He is organising Janta Ki Adalat from the past 15 years.

External links
 Dinesh Rai Munmun

References 

Living people
1967 births
Bharatiya Janata Party politicians from Madhya Pradesh
Madhya Pradesh MLAs 2018–2023
People from Seoni district
People from Seoni, Madhya Pradesh